Psydrax suborbicularis is a species of flowering plant in the family Rubiaceae. It is endemic to Papua New Guinea.

References

External links
World Checklist of Rubiaceae

suborbicularis
Flora of Papua New Guinea
Vulnerable plants
Taxonomy articles created by Polbot
Taxa named by Cyril Tenison White